Eurythmia hospitella is a species of snout moth in the genus Eurhodope. It was described by Zeller in 1875. It has been recorded from Arizona, Florida, Alabama, South Carolina and Illinois.

References

Moths described in 1875
Phycitinae
Taxa named by Philipp Christoph Zeller